Two indirect presidential elections were held in Poland in December 1922. In the first election on 9 December Gabriel Narutowicz was elected president, but he was assassinated five days later. A second election on 22 December was won by Stanisław Wojciechowski.

First election

After the independence of Poland, the head of state was Naczelnik Państwa Józef Piłsudski. In a new constitution adopted by the Polish Sejm, the new head of state was to be the President of Republic of Poland - to be choose by the National Assembly (combined Sejm and Senate). After the parliamentary election, planning began for the first Polish presidential election in history.

The main probable candidate Józef Piłsudski, despite calls for him to contend, did not run for election. He proposed a former Prime Minister, Wincenty Witos, for presidency. Witos also refused. Finally Piłsudski supported the candidature of Minister of Foreign Affairs Gabriel Narutowicz.

At the time of the election the main candidates were count Maurycy Zamoyski, the candidate of National Democracy and Stanisław Wojciechowski, candidate of Polish People's Party "Piast". Narutowicz's good result was a surprise. Once the long voting was over, Zamoyski and Narutowicz advanced to the fifth ballot. Narutowicz finally won the election with the support of "Piast" (Wojciechowski was eliminated on the fourth round).

Narutowicz was sworn in as president on 11 December 1922, but was assassinated five days later.

Candidates

Second election
The first election, when President of the Republic of Poland Gabriel Narutowicz was elected after several rounds by joint chambers of Sejm and Senate (at time of Second Polish Republic joint parliament elected president. The first direct vote took place in 1990). Narutowicz, however, was assassinated just five days since taking office. According to the Constitution the Sejm Marshal Maciej Rataj became Acting President of the Republic of Poland and organised new elections, which took place on 20 December. Stanislaw Wojciechowski won the second election, and took office on 22 December.

Candidates
 Kazimierz Morawski (put on ballot by National Democracy; supporter by allied right-wing parties), philologist and academician from Jagiellonian University
 Stanisław Wojciechowski (put on ballot by Polish People's Party "Wyzwolenie"; supported also by Polish Socialist Party, agrarians and minorities), former Minister of Interior and one of the leading candidates in previous election

See also
List of Polish presidents
Józef Piłsudski
Gabriel Narutowicz
Andrzej Duda

References

Bibliography
Sławomir Koper, Józef Piłsudski. Człowiek i polityk, Warsaw 2011
Dodatek nadzwyczajny, "Kurjer Poznański", 9 December 1922, Poznań.

Poland
Presidential election
Presidential elections in Poland
Political history of Poland
December 1922 events